Odie Armstrong (born September 30, 1981) is a former American football fullback. He played college football at Northwestern Oklahoma State University. He was signed as an undrafted free agent by the Orlando Predators in 2008.

Early life
Armstrong attended Vardaman High School where he was a standout on the football team. During his high school career, Armstrong ran for 5,838 yards and 104 touchdowns. During his senior year, Armstrong set a Mississippi state record with 39 rushing touchdowns. In 2012, Vardaman retired Armstrong's #9 jersey.

College career
Armstrong attended Itawamba Community College after high school. After his graduation from Itawamba, Armstrong attended Northwestern Oklahoma State University, where he continued his football career.

Professional career

Tampa Bay Buccaneers

Orlando Predators

California Redwoods

Tulsa Talons
Armstrong joined the Tulsa Talons, who just moved in the AFL from af2. Armstrong earned Second Team All-Arena honors for the first time in his career. And is the best fullback in arena football

Arizona Rattlers
Armstrong joined the Arizona Rattlers in 2011. Earning All-Arena honors in 2012 & 2013, Armstrong was a big part of the Rattlers back-to-back ArenaBowl Championships.

San Jose SaberCats
On April 10, 2014, Armstrong was assigned to the San Jose SaberCats.

References

External links
 Arena Football League Bio

1981 births
Living people
People from Calhoun County, Mississippi
Players of American football from Mississippi
American football fullbacks
Northwestern Oklahoma State Rangers football players
Orlando Predators players
Sacramento Mountain Lions players
Tulsa Talons players
Arizona Rattlers players
San Jose SaberCats players